Crossosoma is a genus of the plant family Crossosomataceae. It consists of two species of shrubs.

Crossosoma californicum Nutt. is found on the Palos Verdes Peninsula and San Clemente and Santa Catalina islands of California, as well as Guadalupe Island in Baja California.

Crossosoma bigelovii S.Wats. occurs in the deserts of California, Nevada, Arizona, and Baja California.

External links
C. bigelovii treatment from the Jepson Manual
C. californicum treatment from the Jepson Manual

Flora of California
Rosid genera
Crossosomataceae
Flora of Baja California
Flora without expected TNC conservation status